Burnt Tongues is a collection of transgressive fiction stories written by multiple authors, edited by Chuck Palahniuk, Richard Thomas, and Dennis Widmyer. 72 stories were submitted to the fan-made Palahniuk website "The Cult," and then put through a vetting process. Palahniuk then selected and edited 20 of these for publication in the collection.

Narratives

References

2014 anthologies
Horror anthologies